Celebrate the Dead is the third EP by Beherit, released in 2012. The album includes a new song and a re-recording of "Demon Advance", originally found on the Engram album.  The tracks on the EP showcase a decidedly more dark ambient style than those found on their last effort.

Track listing
"Demon Advance" – 13:13
"Celebrate the Dead" – 16:18

References

2012 albums
Beherit albums
Black metal EPs